| lowest attendance   = 50Scarlets PS v Ulster A(20 January 2018)
| tries               = {{#expr: 

 + 3 + 10 + 6 + 8 + 4 + 6 + 5 + 13 + 7 + 6
 + 6 + 10 + 5 + 7 + 6 + 4 + 6 + 13 + 6 + 4
 + 11 + 12 + 9 + 8 + 5 + 7 + 8 + 9 + 3 
 + 3 + 11 + 6 + 8 + 11 + 9 + 3 + 7 + 9 + 7
 + 10 + 9 + 14 + 10 + 9 + 7 + 4 + 2 + 4 + 5
 + 6 + 10 + 4 + 7 + 9 + 3 + 4 + 4 + 5 
 + 7 + 7
 + 5 + 2 + 2 + 7
 + 6 + 7
 + 4
}}
| top point scorer    =  Brendan Cope (Jersey) Luke Daniels (Ealing)83 points each
| top try scorer      =  James Cordy-Redden (Ealing) Will Harries (Ealing)7 tries each
| venue               = Trailfinders Sports Ground
| attendance2         = 1,386
| champions           = Ealing Trailfinders
| count               = 1
| runner-up           = Leinster A
| website             = B&I Cup Website
| previous year       = 2016–17
| previous tournament = 2016–17 British and Irish Cup
| next year           = 
| next tournament     = 
}}

The 2017–18 British and Irish Cup is the ninth and final season of the annual rugby union competition for second tier, semi-professional clubs from Britain and Ireland. Munster A are the defending champions having won the 2016–17 final against Jersey Reds 29–28 at Irish Independent Park, Cork on 21 April 2017. The format of the competition is similar to last season with Scottish clubs not competing. For the third consecutive season the four Welsh teams are the reserve sides of the teams competing in the Pro14 competition instead of clubs from the Welsh Premier Division.

Competition format
The competition format is a pool stage followed by a knockout stage. The pool stage consists of five pools of four teams playing home and away matches. The top side in each pool, plus the three best runners-up, progress to the knockout stage. The eight quarter-finalists are ranked, with top four teams having home advantage. The four winning quarter-finalists progress to the semi-final draw. Most of the matches are played on the same weekends as the European Champions Cup and European Challenge Cup. First round matches begin on 13 October 2017 and the final will be held in April 2018.

Participating teams and locations
The allocation of teams is as follows:
  – twelve clubs from RFU Championship
  – four Irish provinces represented by 'A' teams
  – four Welsh regions represented by Premiership Select teams.

Pool stages

(Q) denotes the team has qualified for the quarter-finals as the pool winners
(q) denotes team has at least qualified for the quarter-finals as one of the three highest-scoring second-place teams

Pool 1

Round 1

Round 2

Round 3

Game postponed due to bad weather (snow).  Game to be rescheduled for 9 March 2018.

Round 4

Round 5

Round 6

Round 3 (rescheduled game)

Game rescheduled from 10 December 2017.

Pool 2

Round 1

Round 2

Round 3

Round 4

Round 5

Round 6

Pool 3

Round 1

Round 2

Round 3

Round 4

Round 5

Round 6

Pool 4

Round 1

Round 2

Round 3

Round 4

Round 5

Round 6

Pool 5

Round 1

Round 2

Round 3

Round 4

Round 5

Round 6

Game postponed due to unplayable pitch caused by bad weather (rain).  Game to be rescheduled for 3 February 2018.

Round 6 (rescheduled game)

Game rescheduled from 20 January 2018.

Knock-out stage
The eight qualifiers are seeded according to performance in the pool stage. The four top seeds hosted the quarter-finals against the lower seeds, in a 1 v 8, 2 v 7, 3 v 6 and 4 v 5 format. However, if two teams qualify from the same group they can not be drawn together. Therefore Leinster A cannot be drawn against Doncaster Knights. 
Teams are ranked by:
1 – competition points (4 for a win, 2 for a draw)
2 – where competition points are equal, greatest number of wins
3 – where the number of wins are equal, aggregate points difference
4 – where the aggregate points difference are equal, greatest number of points scored

Quarter-finals

Semi-finals

Final

Attendances

Individual statistics
 Points scorers includes tries as well as conversions, penalties and drop goals. Appearance figures also include coming on as substitutes (unused substitutes not included).

Top points scorers

Top try scorers

Season records

Team
 Largest home win — 68 points: 68-0 Bristol at home to Cardiff Blues Premiership Select on 19 January 2018
 Largest away win — 57 points: 71-14 Ealing Trailfinders away to Connacht Eagles on 22 October 2017
 Most points scored — 78 points: 78-12 Ealing Trailfinders at home to Connacht Eagles on 13 January 2018
 Most tries in a match — 12: Ealing Trailfinders at home to Connacht Eagles on 13 January 2018
 Most conversions in a match — 9 (3):
 Doncaster Knights at home to Cardiff Blues Premiership Select on 9 December 2017
 Ealing Trailfinders at home to Connacht Eagles on 13 January 2018
 Bristol at home to Cardiff Blues Premiership Select on 19 January 2018
 Most penalties in a match — 4 (4):
 Nottingham away to Ospreys Premiership Select on 16 December 2017
 Ospreys Premiership Select at home to Bedford Blues on 12 January 2018
 Rotherham Titans at home to Richmond on 13 January 2018
 Jersey Reds away to Yorkshire Carnegie on 20 January 2018
 Most drop goals in a match — 0

Player
 Most points in a match — 20 (2):
  Adam McBurney for Ulster A at home to Hartpury College on 16 December 2017
  Brendan Cope for Jersey Reds away to London Scottish on 16 December 2017
 Most tries in a match — 4:  Adam McBurney for Ulster A at home to Hartpury College on 16 December 2017
 Most conversions in a match — 9 (2):
  Simon Humberstone for Doncaster Knights at home to Cardiff Blues Premiership Select on 9 December 2017
  Luke Daniels for Ealing Trailfinders at home to Connacht Eagles on 13 January 2018
 Most penalties in a match — 4 (3):
  Tiff Eden for Nottingham away to Ospreys Premiership Select on 16 December 2017
  Luke Price for Ospreys Premiership Select at home to Bedford Blues on 12 January 2018
  Lee Millar for Rotherham Titans at home to Richmond on 13 January 2018
  Brendan Cope for Jersey Reds away to Yorkshire Carnegie on 20 January 2018
 Most drop goals in a match — 0

Attendances
 Highest — 7,428: Bristol at home to Doncaster Knights on 22 October 2017
 Lowest — 50: Scarlets Premiership Select at home to Ulster A on 20 January 2018
 Highest Average Attendance — 6,611: Bristol
 Lowest Average Attendance — 150: Scarlets Premiership Select

Notes

References

External links
 England Rugby

British and Irish Cup
2017–18 rugby union tournaments for clubs
2017–18 in English rugby union
2017–18 in Irish rugby union
2017–18 in Welsh rugby union
2017–18 RFU Championship